An environmental error is an error in calculations that are being a part of observations due to environment. Any experiment performing anywhere in the universe has its surroundings, from which we cannot eliminate our system. The study of environmental effects has primary advantage of being able us to justify the fact that environment has impact on experiments and feasible environment will not only rectify our result but also amplify it.

Causes
The environmental errors have different causes, which are widening with the passage of time, as the research works telling us, including; temperature, humidity, magnetic field, constantly vibrating earth surface, wind and improper lighting.

Minimizing
In high precision laboratories, where a slightest bug can destroy the whole system, removal or at least minimizing

References

Measurement